Kang Song-san (3 March 1931 – 22 February 1997) was a North Korean politician who served as Premier of North Korea from 1984 to 1986 and again from 1992 to 1997. He succeeded Ri Jong-ok in his first term and Yon Hyong-muk in his second term.

He was born in North Hamgyong. He graduated from Mangyongdae Revolutionary School and from Kim Il-sung University and went to study in the Soviet Union in Moscow State University. He became an instructor in the Central Committee of the Workers' Party of Korea in 1955. Candidate member of the political politburo in 1973, Deputy Prime Minister in 1977, the Sixth Party Congress in 1980 he was elected a member of the Politburo. In 1984, he became the Prime Minister of North Korea.

1991 Chairman of the People's president and secretary hambuk faction, the People's Committee of the Party Central Committee, member of the Political Bureau of the Korean Workers' Party, the Supreme People's Assembly to the delegates in charge of such positions. He was awarded Kim Il-sung Order in 1982.

References

Prime Ministers of North Korea
1931 births
1997 deaths
Members of the 6th Politburo of the Workers' Party of Korea
Members of the 4th Central Committee of the Workers' Party of Korea
Members of the 5th Central Committee of the Workers' Party of Korea
Members of the 6th Central Committee of the Workers' Party of Korea
People from North Hamgyong
People from Kyongwon County